J'Vonne Dieunti Parker (born June 7, 1982 in Scotland Neck, North Carolina) is a former American football defensive tackle. He was signed by the Cleveland Browns as an undrafted free agent in 2005. He played college football at Rutgers.

Parker has also been a member of the Dallas Cowboys, Baltimore Ravens, Atlanta Falcons, Carolina Panthers and Denver Broncos.

Early years
Parker attended Newark Tech.

College career
Parker played college football at Rutgers. As a senior, he played in 11 games recording 19 tackles.

Professional career

First stint with Browns
Parker was originally signed by the Cleveland Browns as an undrafted rookie free agent on April 29, 2005. After spending some time on their active roster where he played in four games making five tackles, he was waived on September 3, 2006.

Dallas Cowboys
The following day he was claimed by the Dallas Cowboys and appeared in two games before being waived.

Second stint with Browns
He was again signed by the Browns and played in four games.

Baltimore Ravens
On October 18, 2007, Parker was signed to the practice squad of the Baltimore Ravens. He was released on October 8, 2008.

Atlanta Falcons
On October 29, 2008, Parker was signed to the practice squad of the Atlanta Falcons. The team released defensive end Sean Conover to make room for Parker.

Carolina Panthers
Parker was signed by the Carolina Panthers on December 23, 2008 when defensive tackle Gary Gibson was placed on Injured reserve.

Denver Broncos
On March 10, 2009, he was signed by the Denver Broncos. He was placed on season-ending injured reserve on August 8.
On March 11, 2010 the Denver Broncos released Parker along with ILB Andra Davis.

References

https://web.archive.org/web/20050211235859/http://www.denverbroncos.com/page.php?id=334

External links
Denver Broncos bio

1982 births
Living people
People from Scotland Neck, North Carolina
American football defensive tackles
Rutgers Scarlet Knights football players
Cleveland Browns players
Dallas Cowboys players
Baltimore Ravens players
Atlanta Falcons players
Carolina Panthers players
Denver Broncos players